Maglemosian ( 9000 –  6000 BC) is the name given to a culture of the early Mesolithic period in Northern Europe. In Scandinavia, the culture was succeeded by the Kongemose culture.

Environment and location
The name originates from the Danish archeological site Maglemose, situated near Gørlev and Høng on western Zealand, southwest of lake Tissø. Here the first settlement of the culture was excavated in 1900, by George Sarauw. During the following century a long series of similar settlements were excavated from England to Poland and from Skåne in Sweden to northern France.

When the Maglemosian culture flourished, sea levels were much lower than now and what is now mainland Europe and Scandinavia were linked with Britain. The cultural period overlaps the end of the last ice age, when the ice retreated and the glaciers melted. It was a long process and sea levels in Northern Europe did not reach current levels until almost 6000 BC, by which time they had inundated large territories previously inhabited by Maglemosian people. Therefore, there is hope that the emerging discipline of underwater archaeology may reveal interesting finds related to the Maglemosian culture in the future.

Characteristics
The Maglemosian people lived in forest and wetland environments, using fishing and hunting tools made from wood, bone, and flint microliths. It appears that they had domesticated the dog. Some may have lived settled lives, but most were nomadic.

Huts made of bark have been preserved, in addition to tools made of flint, bone, and horn. A characteristic of the culture are the sharply edged microliths of flintstone, used for spear and arrow heads. Another notable feature is the leister, a characteristic type of fishing spear, used for gigging.

Scandinavian data table

Genetics

See also
Ahrensburg culture
Deepcar
Doggerland
Koelbjerg Man
Last glacial period
Georg F.L. Sarauw
Star Carr
Thatcham

References

Sources
Anders Fischer: "Submerged Stone Age – Danish Examples and North sea potential"; i: N.C.Flemming: Submarine Prehistory and Archaeology of the North Sea: research priorities and collaboration with industry. CBA Research Report 141, 2004, s. 23ff

Danish-language texts
Geoffrey Bibby: Spadens vidnedsbyrd; Wormanium 1980,  s. 109f
Gyldendal og Politikens Danmarkshistorie (red. af Olaf Olsen); Bind 1: I begyndelsen. Fra de ældste tider til ca. år 200 f.Kr. (ved Jørgen Jensen); 1988, s. 47ff
Jørgen Jensen: Danmarks Oldtid. Stenalder, 13.000–2.000 f.Kr.; Gyldendal 2001,  s. 86ff
Anders Fischer: "En håndfuld flint", Skalk nr. 5, 1973, s. 8ff
Anders Fischer: "Mennesket og havet i ældre stenalder"; i: Carin Bunte (red): Arkeologi och Naturvetenskab, Lund 2005, s. 276ff
Kim Aaris-Sørensen: "Uroksejagt", Skalk nr. 6, 1984, s. 10ff
Ole Grøn: "Teltning", Skalk nr. 1, 1988, s. 13f
Søren A. Sørensen: "Hytte ved sø", Skalk nr. 3, 1988, s. 25ff
Peter Vang Petersen: "Bjørnejagt", Skalk nr. 5, 1991, s. 3ff
Poul og Kristian Krabbe: "Vest for Valhal", Skalk nr. 6, 1995, s. 11ff
Axel Degn Johansen: "Ikke en sky og ikke en vind!", Skalk nr 2, 2008, s. 8ff

Archaeological cultures of Central Europe
Archaeological cultures of Northern Europe
Archaeological cultures of Western Europe
Nordic Stone Age
 Mesolithic cultures of Europe
Archaeological cultures in Belgium
Archaeological cultures in Denmark
Archaeological cultures in England
Archaeological cultures in France
Archaeological cultures in Germany
Archaeological cultures in Lithuania
Archaeological cultures in the Netherlands
Archaeological cultures in Norway
Archaeological cultures in Poland
Archaeological cultures in Sweden
9th-millennium BC establishments